Silvije Strahimir Kranjčević (17 February 1865 – 29 October 1908) was a Croatian poet. His reflexive poetry, reaching its zenith in the 1890s, was a turning point that ushered modern themes in Croatian poetry.

Early life 

Kranjčević was born in Senj. Rebellious as a teenager, he completed his secondary education in a Gymnasium, but did not graduate from it. Soon after joining the elite Germanico- Hungaricum Institute in Rome, where he was supposed to become a priest, he changed his mind and left. The short stay in the Eternal City would show through in his poetry years later.

He attended the one-year course for language and history teachers in Zagreb. With the diploma for a teacher in “citizen schools”, he left to work in Bosnia and Herzegovina. Mostar, Livno, Bijeljina, Sarajevo: those were the cities where he taught and wrote poetry.

Kranjčević made contributions to Albanian culture: while Albanian writer Gjergj Fishta attended Franciscan schools in Bosnia, he met Bosnian Grga Martić and Silvije Strahimir Kranjčević who at that time lived in Bosnia. Martić and Kranjčević awakened literary instinct in Fishta.

He published his first poem, Zavjet (The Pledge) in 1883, a couple of months before leaving for Rome. The magazine where it was published, Hrvatska vila, was led by Eugen Kumičić, a famous writer and politician of the time, who enthusiastically welcomed the fighting spirit in the verses of the unknown young poet. Kranjčević sent another two poems from Rome in 1884, Pozdrav (Salute) and Senju-gradu (Poem for Senj), to Sloboda, a magazine in Sušak. When he came back from Rome, he published Noć na Foru (A Night at the Forum) in Vijenac.

Politically, he was a follower of Starčević and the Croatian Party of Rights. The dark moods of his poems are related to the Hungarian oppression of Croatia.

Bugarkinje

His first poetry book, Bugarkinje (1885), was published in his native Senj. It already announced his three main themes: Homeland, Man and Universe. Kranjčević would never change them, just make them deeper. Bugarkinje is a traditional name given to elegiac folk songs in the Balkans. The first criticism on the book was written by the classical philologist and literary critic  in Vijenac. Šrepel noted Kranjčević's "vivid imagination" and "true poetic enthusiasm", but deplored the uneven quality of his poems. Nevertheless, he concluded that "a new and talented hand has appeared in the Croatian Parnassus".

Later literary figures heaped even more praise on Bugarkinje. The great writer Miroslav Krleža said they presented Kranjčević as a genuine "standard-bearer of freedom". More recently, the literary historian  said that the prophetic and bitter energy of its poems, although occasionally falling into pathos and rhetoric, embraced universal and cosmic themes, which made the young Kranjčević stand out among his contemporaries, such as August Harambašić, whose main themes were declamatory patriotism or romantic love.

Bugarkinje tried to formulate a poetic and political program, with the dedicatory poem to August Šenoa expressing the poetic credo of Kranjčević, while the poems to Croatia, the People and the Worker stood as three pillars of the poet's national and political beliefs.

Kranjčević used Biblical and classical parables, as well as symbols from the history of Christianity and Judaism; their allegorical nature suited his poems about the fundamental human issues.

Later life

His next poetry book, Selected Poems, came more than a decade later, in 1898. The 1890s marked the zenith of his poetic work. It would be followed by two more books: Trzaji (Quivers) in 1902 and Poems in 1908.

In Sarajevo, he was the editor of Nada, a literary magazine published by the Bosnian government, for eight years (1895–1903). The nominal editor was the government adviser Kosta Hörmann, a man of wide horizons and the benefactor of Antun Gustav Matoš, but he trusted Kranjčević with the editorial policy. Because of such freedom, "Nada" attracted the greatest Croatian writers of the time, becoming the most important literary magazine of the Croatian pre-modernist movement, Moderna. It was there that Kranjčević published most of his literary essays and criticisms.

References

External links

 
 Kapitalno djelo o Kranjčeviću
 Bugarkinje

1865 births
1908 deaths
People from Senj
20th-century Croatian poets
19th-century Croatian poets
Croatian male poets
19th-century male writers
20th-century male writers